USS North Carolina may refer to:

 was a ship of the line launched in 1820 and sold in 1867
 was a  launched in 1906 and escorted troop transports during World War I and sold for scrap in 1930
 was a South Dakota-class battleship, laid down but soon canceled by the Washington Naval Treaty in 1920
 is a  launched in 1940; decommissioned in 1947 and a museum ship in Wilmington, North Carolina
 is a  commissioned in 2008 and currently in service

See also

United States Navy ship names